The Bishops' Conference of Indonesia (BCI; Indonesian: KWI/Konferensi Waligereja Indonesia) is the episcopal conference of the Catholic bishops of Indonesia. It was constituted in November 1955, in Surabaya with the name MAWI. KWI is a part of the Federation of Asian Bishops' Conferences.

History

Every bishop, since his ordination, in itself a part of the ranks of the world's Bishops ( Collegium Episcopale ) and together with the bishops all over the world, under the leadership of the Pope, was responsible for the entire Catholic Church.

The bishops in the country together to form a partnership organization called Conference of Bishops. Inside this organization they work to negotiate and decide something about Catholics across the country. A bishop is the head of the local church called the diocese. By doing so he is also called Waligereja. Because of that so the Indonesian Bishops Conference called the Supreme Council of Indonesian Bishops (MAWI) which is then changed to the Bishops' Conference of Indonesia (KWI).

From 1807 until 1902 the Catholic Church throughout the country under the leadership of a Prefect/apostolic vicar based in Batavia. Although some areas since 1902 has been separated from the Apostolic Vicariate of Batavia (1902: Maluku - Irian Jaya, 1905: Borneo, 1911: Sumatra, 1913/1914: Nusa Tenggara, and 1919: Sulawesi), but recognition of the Dutch colonial government to the many Catholic Church leaders in the archipelago just happened in 1913.

Then all Vicar Apostolic Prefect feel that it was necessary to negotiate together to achieve unity in the government attitude towards many issues, but especially relating to freedom for the mission to enter all areas and is also associated with the position of Catholic education.

The meeting occurred on the occasion of the ordination of new bishop. A. Van Velsen as Vicar Apostolic of Jakarta (May 13, 1924) at the Jakarta Cathedral. Were present at that time : Mgr. P. Boss, O.F.M.Cap . (Vicar Apostolic of Kalimantan), Mgr. A. Verstraelen, S.V.D. (Vicar Apostolic of Nusa Tenggara), Mgr. Y. Aerts, M.S.C. (Vicar Apostolic of Maluku - Irian Jaya), Mgr. L.T.M. Brans, O.F.M.Cap. (Prefect Apostolic of Padang) and Mgr. G. Panis, M.S.C. (Prefect Apostolic of Sulawesi).

On September 15 - May 16, 1924 was held the first meeting of Bishops of Nusantara in Jakarta Cathedral. The trial was presided over by Mgr. A. Van Velsen and was attended by the bishops mentioned above plus the two pastors : AHG Brocker, M.S.C. and S.Th. van Hoof, S.J. as a resource.

The second hearing was held on August 31 to September 6, 1925, also in Jakarta, under the leadership of Pope Pius X a messenger named Mgr. B.Y. Gijlswijk, OP, an Apostolic Delegatus in South Africa. Unless the bishops mentioned above, the trial participants has increased by Mgr. H. Smeetes, S.C.J. (Prefect Apostolic of Bengkulu), Mgr. Th. Herkenrat, S.S.C.C. (Prefect Apostolic of Pangkalpinang). Also present Th Fr. De Backere, C.M., Fr Cl. Van de Pas, O.Carm., Father Y. Hoederechts, S.J., being Father H. Jansen, S.J. and Fr Y. Van Baal, S.J. served as secretary.

In this trial it was decided to hold a hearing every five years. The next sessions are: June 4 to 11, 1929 at Muntilan (attended by 10 bishops), 19 to 27 September 1934 at Girisonta (also attended by a priest from Centraal Missie Bureau or the Office of Catholic Bishops), 16-22 August 1939 also in Girisonta (15 bishops and three people from the CMB as well as an Apostolic Delegatus for Australia: Mgr . Y. Panico).

Because of the war, the meeting of the Indonesian Bishops can not be held. On 26-30 April 1954 the Bishops' all over Java hold a meeting in Lawang. There expressed a desire to hold a new conference for all bishops. A draft constitution prepared by Mgr. W. Schoemaker M.S.C. (Bishop Purwokerto) subsequently approved by Internuncio in Jakarta on January 31, 1955. Dated March 14, 1955 Mgr. W. Schoemaker M.S.C. appointed by the Internuncio as the chairman of MAWI for the next meeting.

The meeting can be held on the 25th of October to 2 November 1955 in Bruderan, Surabaya and was attended by 22 bishops (of 25 bishops there). This is the meeting of the Conference of Bishops from all over Indonesia, the first after the war.

One important decision is that henceforth the Indonesian bishops' conference is called the Supreme Council of Bishops of Indonesia, abbreviated MAWI, a translation of the Raad van Kerkvoogden. The date is regarded as the founding date MAWI. In addition to the plenary session, it was decided to set up a small meeting that remains, to carry out daily tasks, which is called the Central Indonesian Bishops' Council, abbreviated DEWAP, which is chaired by Mgr. Albertus Soegijapranata, S.J. (Vicar Apostolic of Semarang). To improve the performance of its duties, established various " Committee "/PWI (Indonesian Bishops ' Committee) is a member of DEWAP (decided that DEWAP convene once a year) and that addressing one service area: PWI (Indonesian Bishops' Committee) Social, Catholic and Apostolic Action PWI layman, PWI Seminary and University, Education and Religion PWI, PWI catechesis People and Propagation of the Faith, PWI Press and Propaganda. It was decided that DEWAP convene once a year .

After Indonesia's independence the number of Catholics Indonesia increased considerably. So rapid development of Indonesian Catholic congregation, so that in a meeting in Girisonta, Ungaran, Central Java (9 to 16 May 1960) Indonesian bishops wrote a letter to Pope John XXIII, pleading for him to officially inaugurate the establishment of the Church hierarchy in Indonesia. Then by decree " Quod Christus Adorandus " dated January 3, 1961 Pope John XXIII inaugurated the establishment of the Church hierarchy in Indonesia.

Since 1987, the Supreme Council of Indonesian Bishops (MAWI) renamed the Bishops' Conference of Indonesia (KWI). KWI Leadership held by the Presidium of KWI. In the General Secretariat assembled all officials who helped facilitate the work of the Indonesian bishops' pastoral.

Objectives
KWI is a Federation of The Catholic Bishops, of Indonesia, which aims to promote unity and cooperation in their pastoral duties to lead Catholics in Indonesia. KWI is not "above" or supervises bishops, each bishop remains autonomous. KWI does not have branches in the area.

Members
Until now the number of members is 38, the number of dioceses in Indonesia 37, each bishop lead one diocese, except the Diocese of Ambon that having two Bishops, the Archbishop and the Auxiliary Bishop. All bishops in Indonesia are members of KWI, except for the retired bishops.

Organization Structure

Board
President 	   :	Mgr. Ignatius Suharyo Hardjoatmodjo
Vice President    : 	Mgr. Leo Laba Ladjar, OFM
Vice President II : 	Mgr. Petrus Turang
Secretary General :	Mgr. Antonius Subianto Bunyamin, OSC
Treasurer	   :	Mgr. Silvester San
Members	   	
Mgr. Aloysius Sudarso SCJ
Mgr. Pius Riana Prapdi
Mgr. Petrus Boddeng Timang
Mgr. P.C. Mandagi MSC

Chairmen of the Commissions
Commission for Ecumenical and Interreligious Dialogue : Mgr. P.C.Mandagi MSC
Commission for Mission : Mgr. Edmund Woga CSSR
Commission for Catechetics : Mgr. John Liku Ada
Commission for Justice and Peace : Mgr. Agustinus Agus
Commission for Family : Mgr. Frans Kopong Kung
Commission for the Luity : Mgr. Yustinus Harjosusanto MSF
Commission for Social Communications : Mgr. Petrus Turang
Commission for Liturgy : Mgr. Aloysius Sutrisnaatmaka MSF
Commission for Migrants and Itinerant : Mgr. Agustinus Agus
Commission for Education : Mgr. Martinus Dogma Situmorang
Commission for Socio Economic Development : Mgr. Hilarion Datus Lega
Commission for Seminary : Mgr. Dominikus Saku
Commission for Youth : Mgr. John Philipus Saklil
Commission for Theology : Mgr. Petrus Boddeng Timang

Delegates
Delegate for Catholic Health Services : Mgr. Hubertus Leteng
Delegate for The Catholic Bible Institution : Mgr. Vincentius Sensi Potokota
Head of Inter-diocese Solidarity Fund (DSAK) :	Mgr.H.Datus Lega
KWI representative for BKBLII : Mgr. Hilarius Moa Nurak SVD
Moderator of Gender Secretariat and Empowerment of Women : Mgr. Vincentius Sutikno

Monetary Council
Chairman	:	Mgr. Silvester San
Member I	:	Mgr. H.Datus Lega
Member II 	: 	Mgr. Giulio Mencuccini OP

Archdioceses and Dioceses

Region of Sumatra
Ecclesiastical Province of  Medan	
Archdiocese of Medan
Diocese of Sibolga
Diocese of Padang

Ecclesiastical Province of  Palembang 	
Archdiocese of Palembang
Diocese of Pangkal-Pinang
Diocese of Tanjungkarang

Region of Java
Ecclesiastical Province of  Jakarta
Archdiocese of Jakarta
Diocese of Bandung
Diocese of Bogor

Ecclesiastical Province of  Semarang 	
Archdiocese of Semarang
Diocese of Malang
Diocese of Purwokerto
Diocese of Surabaya

Region of Kalimantan
Ecclesiastical Province of  Pontianak	
Archdiocese of Pontianak
Diocese of Ketapang 
Diocese of Sanggau
Diocese of Sintang 	

Ecclesiastical Province of  Samarinda
Archdiocese of Samarinda 
Diocese of Banjarmasin
Diocese of Palangkaraya
Diocese of Tanjung Selor

Ecclesiastical Province of Makassar-Amboina-Manado (MAM)
Ecclesiastical Province of  Makassar
Archdiocese of Makassar
Diocese of Amboina
Diocese of Manado

Region of Nusa Tenggara
Ecclesiastical Province of  Ende
Archdiocese of Ende
Diocese of Denpasar
Diocese of Larantuka
Diocese of Maumere
Diocese of Ruteng

Ecclesiastical Province of  Kupang
Archdiocese of Kupang
Diocese of Atambua
Diocese of Weetebula

Ecclesiastical Province of Papua
Ecclesiastical Province of  Merauke
Archdiocese of Merauke
Diocese of Agats
Diocese of Jayapura
Diocese of Manokwari-Sorong
Diocese of Timika

References

External links
 Official Website

Indonesia
Catholic Church in Indonesia